Grand Bonhomme is a mountain in the south of the island of Saint Vincent in Saint Vincent and the Grenadines.

Notes

External links

Mountains of Saint Vincent and the Grenadines
Pleistocene stratovolcanoes